Papaliitele Molioo Laupepa Malietoa (3 December 1940 – 28 September 1985) was a Western Samoan chief and politician. He served as a member of the Legislative Assembly from 1982 to 1985, and as Minister of Justice for a short period in 1982.

Biography
The son of paramount chief Malietoa Tanumafili II, Papaliitele was educated at Newington College in Sydney between 1951 and 1958 where he was a boarding student enrolled under the name Leupepa Malietoa. While at the school, he was a member of the rugby union first XV for four years. After university, he worked for the External Affairs Department of the New Zealand government between 1960 and 1962, returning to Western Samoa when it became independent to work in the Department of the Prime Minister. He subsequently trained at Portsea Military College in Australia from 1964 to 1965, reaching the rank of second lieutenant. He joined the New Zealand armed forces and served in Malaysia as assistant battalion adjutant between 1967 and 1969.

After leaving the army in 1969, Papaliitele managed his family plantations. He was conferred with the chiefly titles Molioo in 1974 and Laupepa in 1978. His father had become Head of State at independence, and he served as his aide-de-camp from 1976 to 1979. He contested the 1979 elections to the Legislative Assembly in the Fa'asaleleaga No. 2 constituency, losing by three votes to Asi Eikeni. In the 1982 elections he defeated Eikeni by 85 votes and was elected to the Assembly. Following the elections, he was appointed Minister of Justice in September, but served only until December.

Papaliitele lost his seat to Eikeni in the February 1985 elections and died in September the same year. He was survived by his wife Afioga Aioro Sia Malietoa.

References

People educated at Newington College
New Zealand public servants
Samoan civil servants
New Zealand military personnel
Samoan chiefs
Members of the Legislative Assembly of Samoa
Government ministers of Samoa
1940 births
1985 deaths